Roy Southwell  was the first Archdeacon of Northolt from 1970 to 1980.

Born in Sudbury on 3 December 1914, he was educated at Sudbury Grammar School and King's College London. After curacies  in  Wigan and Kennington he held incumbencies at Ixworth (1948), Bury St Edmunds (1951) and Bucklesham (1956)   before becoming the Diocese of St Edmundsbury and Ipswich’s  Director of Education, a post he held from 1959 to 1967. He was Vicar of Hendon from then until his Archdeacon’s appointment.

He died on 23 July 2011. He had married Nancy Sharp and had two daughters.

References

1914 births
People from Sudbury, Suffolk
People educated at Sudbury Grammar School
Alumni of King's College London
Archdeacons of Northolt
2011 deaths